Horthy is a Hungarian surname. It may refer to

István Horthy (1904–1942), Hungarian politician
István Horthy, Jr. (born 1941), Hungarian architect
Miklós Horthy (1868–1957), Hungarian political leader
Miklós Horthy, Jr. (1907–1993), Hungarian politician

Hungarian-language surnames